Blenderhead was an American punk rock band signed to Tooth & Nail Records.  They released three albums from 1992 to 2001. The band reunited for guitarist Tyler Vander Ploeg's 40th birthday in March 2016.

Band members
Current
 Billy Power - vocals (1992-2001, 2016), Bass
 Ed Carrigan - guitar (1992-2001)
 Tyler Vander Ploeg - guitar
 Paul Henry - bass
 Matt Johnson - drums (1992-2001, 2016)
Former
 Eben Haase - vocals, guitar
 Bryan Gray - guitar (1992; played in The Blamed)
 Flav Giorgini - guitar (Briefly; Currently in Squirtgun)
 Bil Repenning - guitar (1992)

Albums
 Prime Candidate for Burnout (1994)
 Muchacho Vivo (1995)
 EP (1997)
 Figureheads On The Forefront Of Pop Culture (2001)

External links
 Blenderhead profile on Tooth & Nail Records
 Blenderhead's Facebook profile
 Hey, what happened? An interview with Bill Power of Blenderhead (Welcome To Flavor Country - March 2011
 Fast FWD – What They’re Up 2 Now: Bill Power of Blenderhead (Indie Vision Music - January 2014)
 Blenderhead Music on iTunes
 Blenderhead Music on Spotify
 Blenderhead Music on Last.fm
 Figureheads Review @ Ink 19 (2001)
 Billy Power
 Matt Johnson
 Urban Achiever Podcast

Musical groups established in 1994
Punk rock groups from Washington (state)
1994 establishments in Washington (state)